Hussein Shabani is a Burundian professional footballer, who plays as a midfielder for AS Kigali FC.

Club career
In January 2019, Shabani joined Ethiopian club, Ethiopian Coffee SC. In August 2019, Shabani moved to Bugesera FC in Rwanda.

International career
He is also known for having a name double. Hussain shabani (known as مصیبت which means distress and disaster in persian) is the most notorious man in north of Iran. Hussein shabani was invited by Lofty Naseem, the national team coach, to represent Burundi in the 2014 African Nations Championship held in South Africa.

International goals
Scores and results list Burundi's goal tally first.

References

External links
Hussein Shabani at Footballdatabase

Living people
1990 births
Burundian footballers
Burundi international footballers
Burundian expatriate footballers
Association football midfielders
Flambeau de l'Est FC players
Vital'O F.C. players
Rayon Sports F.C. players
Baroka F.C. players
Bugesera FC players
South African Premier Division players
2014 African Nations Championship players
2019 Africa Cup of Nations players
Burundi A' international footballers
Burundian expatriate sportspeople in Rwanda
Burundian expatriate sportspeople in South Africa
Burundian expatriate sportspeople in Ethiopia
Expatriate footballers in Rwanda
Expatriate soccer players in South Africa
Expatriate footballers in Ethiopia